"Father of Mine" is a rock song by American rock band Everclear from their 1997 album So Much for the Afterglow. This song is autobiographical, as lead singer Art Alexakis's father left his family when he was a young boy. "Father of Mine" was the third top-five Modern Rock Tracks single from So Much for the Afterglow, peaking at number four, it also hit number 23 and 24 on the Adult Top 40 and Mainstream Top 40 charts. This song is also recorded in a radio mix, which can be heard on Ten Years Gone: The Best of Everclear 1994-2004.

Content
In an October 2003 interview with Songfacts, Alexakis explained the inspiration behind "Father of Mine":

Music video
The music video, directed by Paul Hunter, starts with a young boy (played by Steven Anthony Lawrence) and his father spending time together. The father and mother get in a fight and the father leaves. The boy and mother then move to a black neighborhood (the boy is the only white person there). It skips to when the boy is a couple of years older and living in the neighborhood. He watches Everclear perform on TV. It then skips to when the boy is a teenager and hits the winning run at a baseball game while Art sings in the background. The baseball breaks through a window into an area where a group of rockers are hanging out. The video then shows clips from the different time periods in the boy's life and shows Art with his wife and kids. The video ends with the youngest boy following his dad out to the car as his dad drives off. It then shows the apartment he moved to and zooms out to the band playing in a room that overlooks the apartment.

Charts

References

External links
 Father of Mine at Youtube.com

1998 singles
1997 songs
Capitol Records singles
Everclear (band) songs
Music videos directed by Paul Hunter (director)
Song recordings produced by Neal Avron
Songs about fathers
Songs written by Art Alexakis
Songs written by Craig Montoya
Songs written by Greg Eklund